Jianxing Township is a township in Ninglang Yi Autonomous County, Yunnan province, China. , it has seven villages under its administration:
Dabaidi Village
Shalihe Village
Shali Village
Zhushan Village
Jiema Village
Shimenkan Village
Heichidi Village

See also 
 List of township-level divisions of Yunnan

References 

Township-level divisions of Lijiang
Ninglang Yi Autonomous County